Kozomor (Serbian Cyrillic: Козомор) is a mountain in western Serbia. Its highest peak Veliki Kozomor has an elevation of 1,007 meters above sea level. It lies near the town of Kosjerić.

References

Mountains of Serbia